This is a list of seasons completed by the West Virginia State Yellow Jackets football team of the National Collegiate Athletic Association, Division II. Adolph Hamblin served as head coach from 1921 to 1944 and led the 1936 West Virginia State Yellow Jackets football team to a black college football national championship. They were previously members of the Central Intercollegiate Athletic Association (CIAA) and West Virginia Intercollegiate Athletic Conference WVIAC). They are currently members of the Mountain East Conference (MEC).

Seasons

References

West Virginia State

West Virginia State Yellow Jackets football seasons